Global Mall Taoyuan A19 is a shopping mall located in Zhongli District, Taoyuan City, Taiwan that opened on September 30, 2021. The entertainment facilities of the mall will include a large rock climbing facility as well as ice skating rinks. The main core stores of the mall include Crocs, Hang Ten, Roots, Daiso, Carrefour and various themed restaurants. The mall is located in close proximity to Taoyuan Sports Park metro station on the Taoyuan Metro and will be the eighth store of Global Mall.

See also
 List of tourist attractions in Taiwan
 Global Mall Linkou A9
 Global Mall Taoyuan A8

References

External links

2021 establishments in Taiwan
Shopping malls in Taoyuan
Shopping malls established in 2021